Artechouse (stylized in all caps) is an American innovative art space and destination for immersive and interactive art exhibitions. Dedicated to showcasing works by new media artists, Artechouse main goal is to present exhibitions that support its mission to inspire, educate, and empower others.

At Artechouse, visitors are offered an interactive experience. During after-hours, visitors at the Washington, D.C. location are invited to purchase an Augmented Reality cocktail inspired by the exhibition.

History
Artechouse was founded in 2015 by art advocates Sandro Kereselidze and Tatiana Pastukhova.  The first gallery opened in 2017 in the Southwest neighborhood of Washington, D.C., occupying a subterranean retail space that was vacant for over 25 years. Artechouse opened its second location in December 2018 on Collins Avenue in Miami Beach. A new location in the Chelsea neighborhood of New York City has been announced.

As of December 2018, Artechouse has presented ten exhibitions.

Washington, D.C.:
 Adrien M & Claire B, XYZT: Abstract Landscape, opened June 1, 2017 
 ABlok & Noirflux, Spirit of Autumn, opened September, 2017 
 Thomas Blanchard, Kingdom of Colors, opened October 21, 2017.
 Ouchhh, Parallel Universe, opened January 18, 2018 
 Sakura Yume, Cherry Blossom Dream, opened March 15, 2018 
 NONOTAK, Naked Eyes: Celebration of Light, opened May 16, 2018 
 Julius Horsthuis, Fractal Worlds, opened July 6, 2018 
 Marpi, New Nature, opened October 12, 2018.

Albuquerque, N.M.:
 Adrien M & Claire B, XYZT: Abstract Landscape, opened May 24, 2018 

Miami, FL.:
 Adrien M & Claire B, XYZT: Abstract Landscape, opened December 8, 2018.

References

Art museums and galleries in Washington, D.C.
Art galleries established in 2017
2017 establishments in Washington, D.C.
Museums of digital art